Gonadal dysgenesis is classified as any congenital developmental disorder of the reproductive system
in the male or female. It is the atypical development of the gonads in an embryo,
with reproductive tissue replaced with functionless, fibrous tissue, termed streak gonads.
Streak gonads are a form of aplasia, resulting in hormonal failure that manifests as sexual infantism and infertility, with no initiation of puberty and secondary sex characteristics.

Gonadal development is a genetically controlled process by the chromosomal sex (XX or XY) which directs the formation of the gonad (ovary or testis).

Differentiation of the gonads requires a tightly regulated cascade of genetic, molecular and morphogenic events.
At the formation of the developed gonad, steroid production influences local and distant receptors for continued morphological and biochemical changes.
This results in the appropriate phenotype corresponding to the karyotype (46,XX for females and 46,XY for males).

Gonadal dysgenesis arises from the failure of signalling in this tightly regulated process during early foetal development.

Manifestations of gonadal dysgenesis are dependent on the aetiology and severity of the underlying defect.

Causes
 Pure gonadal dysgenesis 46,XX also known as XX gonadal dysgenesis
 Pure gonadal dysgenesis 46,XY also known as XY gonadal dysgenesis
 Mixed gonadal dysgenesis also known as partial gonadal dysgenesis, and 45,X/46,XY mosaicism
 Turner syndrome also known as 45,X or 45,X0
 Endocrine disruptions

Pathogenesis

46,XX gonadal dysgenesis

46,XX gonadal dysgenesis is characteristic of female hypogonadism with a karyotype of 46,XX. Streak ovaries are present with non-functional tissues unable to produce the required sex steroid oestrogen.
Low levels of oestrogen effect the HPG axis with no feedback to the anterior pituitary to inhibit the secretion of FSH and LH.

FSH and LH are secreted at abnormal elevated levels. Improper levels of these hormones will cause a failure to initiate puberty, undergo menarche, and develop secondary sex characteristics. If sufficient functional ovarian tissue is present, limited menstrual cycles can occur.

The pathogenesis of 46,XX gonadal dysgenesis is unclear, as it can manifest from a variety of dysregulations. Interruption during ovarian development in embryogenesis can cause 46,XX gonadal dysgenesis with cases of abnormalities in the FSH receptor and mutations in steroidogenic acute regulatory protein (StAR protein) which regulates steroid hormone production.

46,XY gonadal dysgenesis

46,XY gonadal dysgenesis is characteristic of male hypogonadism with karyotype 46,XY.

In embryogenesis, the development of the male gonads is controlled by the testis determining factor located on the sex-determining region of the Y chromosome (SRY).
The male gonad is dependent on SRY and the signalling pathways initiated to several other genes to facilitate testis development.

The aetiology of 46,XY gonadal dysgenesis can be caused by mutations in the genes involved in testis development such as SRY, SOX9, WT1, SF1, and DHH.

If a single or combination of these genes are mutated or deleted, downstream signalling  is disrupted, leading to malformation of male external genitalia.

SRY acts on gene SOX9 which drives Sertoli cell formation and testis differentiation. An absence in SRY causes SOX9 to not be expressed at the appropriate time or concentration, leading to a deficiency in testosterone and anti-Müllerian hormone production.

Inadequate levels of testosterone and anti-Müllerian hormone disrupts the development of Wolffian ducts and internal genitalia that are key to male reproductive tract development. The lack of the male associated steroid hormones drives Müllerian duct development and promotes the development of female genitalia.

Gonadal streaks replace the tissues of the testes, resembling ovarian stroma absent of follicles. 46,XY gonadal dysgenesis can remain unsuspected until delayed pubertal development is observed.

Approximately 15% of cases of 46,XY gonadal dysgenesis carry de novo mutations in the SRY gene, with an unknown causation for the remaining portion of 46,XY gonadal dysgenesis patients.

Mixed gonadal dysgenesis

Mixed gonadal dysgenesis, also known as X0/XY mosaicism or partial gonadal dysgenesis, is a sex development disorder associated with sex chromosome aneuploidy and mosaicism of the Y chromosome. Mixed gonadal dysgenesis is the presence of two or more germ line cells.

The degree of development of the male reproductive tract is determined by the ratio of germ line cells expressing the XY genotype.

Manifestations of mixed gonadal dysgenesis are highly variable with asymmetry in gonadal development of testis and streak gonad, accounted for by the percentage of cells expressing XY genotype.

The dysgenic testis can have adequate functional tissue to produce satisfactory levels of testosterone to cause masculinisation.

Mixed gonadal dysgenesis is poorly understood at the molecular level. The loss of the Y chromosome can occur from deletions, translocations, or migration failure of paired chromosomes during cell division. The chromosomal loss results in partial expression of the SRY gene, giving rise to abnormal development of the reproductive tract and altered hormone levels.

Turner syndrome

Turner syndrome, also known as 45,X or 45,X0, is a chromosomal abnormality characterised by a partial or completely missing second X chromosome, giving a chromosomal count of 45, instead of the typical count of 46 chromosomes.

Dysregulation in meiosis signalling to germ cells during embryogenesis may result in nondisjunction and monosomy X from separation failure of chromosomes in either the parental gamete or during early embryonic divisions.

The aetiology of Turner syndrome phenotype can be the result of haploinsufficiency, where a portion of critical genes are rendered inactive during embryogenesis. Normal ovarian development requires these vital regions of the X chromosome that are inactivated. Clinical manifestation include primary amenorrhea, hypergonadotropic hypogonadism, streak gonads, infertility, and failure to develop secondary sex characteristics. Turner syndrome is not diagnosed until a delayed onset of puberty with Müllerian structures found to be in infantile stage. Physical phenotypic characteristics include short stature, dysmorphic features and lymphedema at birth. Comorbidities include heart defects, vision and hearing problems, diabetes, and low thyroid hormone production.

Endocrine disruptions

Endocrine disruptors interfere with the endocrine system and hormones. Hormones are critical for the correct events in embryogenesis to occur. Foetal development relies on the proper timing of the delivery of hormones for cellular differentiation and maturation. Disruptions can cause sexual development disorders leading to gonadal dysgenesis.

Diagnosis

Management

History
Turner syndrome was first described independently by Otto Ulrich in 1930 and Henry Turner in 1938. 46,XX pure gonadal dysgenesis was first reported in 1960. 46,XY pure gonadal dysgenesis, also known as Swyer syndrome, was first described by Gim Swyer in 1955.

See also 
 (DoDI) 6130.03, 2018, section 5, 13f and 14m
 Ovotestis
 46 XX

References

External links 

Congenital disorders of female genital organs
Intersex variations
Rare diseases